Mechtild Borrmann (born 1960 in Cologne, West Germany) is a German writer, author of several detective novels.

Biography 
Borrmann trained in therapy through dance and theater, then worked in restoration.

In 2006, she published her first novel, Wenn das Herz im Kopf schlägt) (To Clear the Air), with which she won the 2012 Deutscher Krimi Preis. In 2014, her fifth detective novel was published, Der Geiger (The Violinist), which earned her the 2015 Grand prix des lectrices de Elle.

Publications 
Novels
2006: Wenn das Herz im Kopf schlägt. KBV-Verlag, Hillesheim, 
2007: Morgen ist der Tag nach gestern. Pendragon, Bielefeld, 
2009: Mitten in der Stadt. Pendragon, Bielefeld, 
2011: Wer das Schweigen bericht. Pendragon, Bielefeld,  
2012: Der Geiger. Droemer, Munich, 
2014: Die andere Hälfte der Hoffnung. Droemer, Munich, 
2016: Trümmerkind. Droemer, Munich, 
2018: Grenzgänger. Droemer, Munich, 
2022: Feldpost. Droemer, Munich, 

Narratives 
2009: Freundschaftspreis. In OWL-kriminell. KBV-Verlag
2009: Seltene Seerose. In Mordswestfalen. Pendragon
2010: Aufnahme. In So wie du mir: 19 Variationen über Die Judenbuche by Annette von Droste-Hülshoff. Pendragon
2013: Die Spur zurück. Knaur, Münich,  (ebook)

Prizes and distinctions

Prizes 
2012: Deutscher Krimi Preis for Wenn das Herz im Kopf schlägt
2015: Grand prix des lectrices de Elle for Der Geiger

References

External links 
  Mechtild Borrmann's website
  Mechtild Borrmann on Babelio
 Mechtild Borrmann on Goodreads
  Interview with Mechtild Borrmann about Trümmerkind

1960 births
Writers from Cologne
German women novelists
21st-century German writers
German crime fiction writers
Living people
21st-century German women